Two ships of the United States Coast Guard were named Yamacraw:

United States Coast Guard ship names